Manuel Palau Boix (4 January 1893 – 18 February 1967) was a Spanish composer and teacher in Valencia Conservatory. He wrote a large number of symphonic, band (wind orchestra), choral and chamber works. He was one of the most popular and important composers of his time. He received the Spanish National Music Award (Premio Nacional de Música) twice, first in 1927 and again in 1945. His music is known within the Spanish classical music for being a representative of what it has been called “Mediterranean” style, like other Spanish musicians such as Vicente Asencio or Oscar Esplá.

The cities of Valencia, Alfara del Patriarca, Llíria, Alaquàs and Xirivella named streets after him. There is a Spanish choir called Manuel Palau in his honor.

Biography

Palau lived some of the sweetest and most bitter moments of art in Spain. He had the good fortune to be a contemporary of a large number of artists (painters, poets, musicians) and scientists who had achieved international significance. However, he also had the misfortune of living through the horrendous events of the military insurrection against the legitimate government of the country and suffered the post-war horrors that severely impeded artistic production. But the Valencian musician composed until the end of his days, motivated by the satisfaction that his own creative activity gave him.

Born in Alfara del Patriarca (Valencia) on 4 January 1893, he started his musical education at the Conservatory of Music in Valencia. He studied composition with Charles Koechlin and Ravel and many of his compositions are influenced by the impressionism.

In 1927 and 1945 he won the Premio Nacional de Música (Spanish National Music Award).

He was a teacher in the Conservatory of Valencia and became principal in 1951. Among his students there are international musicians such the conductor Manuel Galduf, the professor Salvador Seguí, etc.

Manuel Palau Boix died in Valencia on 18 February 1967.

Style

Palau looked into the French musical mirror, where he found some of his more important musical influences. The artistic currents that coexisted at that moment influenced his music to a greater or lesser degree. An review of some of those styles, Palau’s sources of inspiration, bring us closer to the European musical environment of that time. But, without doubt, one of the elements that marked his music in a definite way, was to be Valencian folklore. Originally from a small village in the Valencian countryside (Alfara del Patriarca), the music that he heard sung at parties, weddings, etc., were to become his constant inspiration. Sometimes, he recreates a given popular themes, other times he invented melodies himself in the style of folk music, giving his compositions a peculiarity that differentiates his music from other Spanish music of the time (that often looked to the South of Spain for its inspiration) that had become popular towards the end of the 19th century.

Manuel Palau looks for the Valencian’s colour: at a time in which Andalusian regionalism was dominant, the maestro sought inspiration in his own cultural roots.

Recordings

Orchestras as the ONE (National Orchestra of Spain), ORTVE (Spanish Radio TV Orchestra) Joven Orquesta de la Generalitat Valenciana, have recorded his music, including soloists such Narciso Yepes, Bertomeu Jaume, Rafael Serrallet and Manuel Galduf, etc.

Legacy

In 2013 Palau’s heirs donated their musical material to the Valencian Library and IVM (Valencian Musical Institute). 3.069 books and scores from his personal library, 196 recordings, 109 publications, and 1.242 documents from his personal archive (840 manuscripts of his works).

Works

Despite his prolific musical production, Manuel Palau is relatively unknown in the music world. Palau left a very interesting collection of music, including guitar works and, additionally, he wrote a substantial concerto that is almost forgotten today and has been barely performed since his composition.

Manuel Palau wrote more than hundred Lieder, one guitar concerto (Concert of Valencia or Concierto Levantino), two piano concerti, three symphonies, choral music, ballet, the opera Maror.

Here a list of works.

Orchestra

    1919 Coplas de mi tierra (There is also a wind orchestra version)
    1920 Escenes i paisatges valencians
        Adagietto
        Dansa
    1921 Tres danses valencianes
        Dansa dels xiquets
        Dansa de la colla antiga
        Dansa de la colla muntanyenca
    1924 Danza morisca
    1924 Tres impresiones orquestales
        Andantino
        Non tropo lento
        Alla marcia
    1927 Siluetes - Suite (There is also a wind orchestra version)
        Dolçainers
        Llauradors
        ...i els xiquet passen
    1928 Gongoriana (There is also a wind orchestra version)
        Noel
        Celosa está la niña
        Humoresca
        Ecaristica
        En el baile del agido
        Glorioso parta Don Juan
    1929 Cançó de bressol (Lullaby) for voice and string orchestra
    1929 Homenaje a Debussy
    1930 Muntanyesa
    1932 Four preludes for string orchestra
    1933 Obertura española
    1934 El ball de la falla for voice and orchestra
    1935 La copla del inclusero for choir and orchestra
    1935 Poemes de llum
        Crepuscular
        Nocturnal
        Matinada
    1935 València per a piano i orquestra
    1936 Marxa burlesca (originally composed for the Valencian saxophones ensemble "Filarmonia")
    1936 Documental valenciana
        Allegro non tanto
        Andante
        Vivo
    1937 Divertimento
        Obertura
        Siciliana
        Rigodón
        Pavana
        Giga
    1938 O quam suavis for baritone,  male choir and string orchestra
    1939/1949 Mascarada sarcástica
    1940 Simfonia núm 1 in e-mino
        Allegro deciso
        Largo. Andante cantabile
        Animato. Scherzo
        Allegro. Finale
    1942 Salve for choir and orchestra
    1944 Simfonia núm. 2 en re major - Murciana
        Largo. Allegro energico
        Lento. Tiempo de parranda. Lentamente
        Presto
        Allegro giocoso
    1946 Dramatic Concerto for piano and orchestra
        Lento. Allegro non tanto
        Lentamente
        Allegro deciso
    1947/1959 Concert of Valencia (Concierto Levantino) for guitar and orchestra
        Allegro non tanto. Allegro deciso
        Larghetto. Animado. Larghetto
        Presto
    1950 Simfonia number 3
    1950 Salmantinas for female choir and orchestra.
    1951/1955 Escena y danza de Omar
    1953 Two aquarelles for string orchestra
    1956 Tríptico catedralicio (There is also a wind orchestra version)
    1963 Heráldica
    Anthem for nuevo al Santísimo Cristo Verdadero for choir and orchestra.
    Criatura dolcíssima for voice and orchestra. Texts by  Joan Fuster
    Suite in old stile

Wind orchestra (Banda de música)

    1920 Himne a la bandera for choir and wind orchestra.
    1921 Marxa valenciana n. 2
    1922 Himne a Bétera for choir and wind orchestra.
    1922 La cançó del poble
    1923 Marxa valenciana n. 4
    1923 Pasodoble andaluz
    1924 Penya truquera
    1924 ¡Vaya lo fino!
    1924 Danza mora
    1925 Soc de Moncà
    1925 Poemas de juventud
    1929 Marcha n. 13
    1930 Cançó de renaixença for choir and banda.
    1936 Two school songs for children's choir and wind orchestra. 
    1946 Manises Anthem
    1947 Blayo
    1956 Marcha solemne
    1961 Riberas del Jiloca
    1961 Rumores del Genil
    Himne escolar for choir and wind orchestra

Theatre

    1917 Farandulerías
    1918 Beniflors, Valencian zarzuela in one act
    1920 Amor torna, Dramatic  Valencian zarzuela in 2 acts 
    1922 A vora mar Valencian zarzuela in one act
    1938 Lliri blau Ballet in two acts
    1938 Sino Ballet in one act
    1946 Joyel Ballet
    1956 Maror, opera. Text de Xavier Casp

Choir

    1941 Aclamaciones for male choir
    1947 Hermosita, hermosita
    1950 Two songs from Alicante
    1951 Cançó innocent de Blanca Fe
    1952 Dos líricas de Anacreonte for male choir
    1952 Scherzino for female choir
    1956 Bienaventurados
    1958 Lletania en flor for female and children's choir
    1958 Sega, segador
    1959 Cançó d'hivern
    1960 Four coral poems
    1963 Laudate Dominum omnes gentes
    1963 Quatre petites composicions
    1965 La Santa Cena
    1967 Cançoneta del balcó for female choir
    Cançons humorístiques

More works

    1918 Gozos al Patriarca San José for choir and organ
    1918 Rosario for choir and organ
    1942 Nupcias for  organ
    1944 Himno al Apostolado de la Oración for choir and organ
    1944/1960 M in g-minor for soloists, choir and orchestra 
    1945 Atardecer  for soloists, choir and orchestra
    1945 Ave María for tenor, choir and orchestra
    1946 Deus Israel conjugat Vos for children's choir and orchestra
    1954 Anthem a Sant Vicent Ferrer for choir and organ
    1955 Anthem for Coronació del Sant Crist de la Fe for choir and organ
    1956 Credo for choir and organ
    1956 Himno a la Santísima Virgen de la Fuensanta for choir and organ
    1956 Himno de María Santísima de Araceli for choir and organ
    1959 Cants de primavera for soprano, female choir and orchestra
    1961 Cantarella for children's choir and organ
    1961 Justus germinabit for choir and organ
    1965 Balada a l'absent for soprano, female choir and orchestra
    1965 Canción amatoria for female choir and orchestra
    1965 Cançons de la llar for female choir and orchestra
    1965 Cançons del folklore infantívol for female choir and orchestra
    1965 Rapsòdia d'abril for soprano, female choir and orchestra
    1965 Seguerilles for female choir and orchestra
    1965 Vibración de estío for female choir and orchestra
    Fughetta per a conjunt de saxòfons
    Anthem to The Purísima for choir and organ
    Anthem to Virgen de las Angustias for choir and organ

References

External links
 Manuel Palau i Boix Archive (Biblioteca Valenciana)
 Summary of the thesis: Manuel Palau and the guitar. The irresistible call of music. 
 Biography (in Spanish)
 Manuel Palau and the guitar (in Spanish)
 Concierto Levantino (In Spanish)

Spanish classical composers
20th-century classical composers
Spanish male classical composers
People from Horta Nord
Composers from the Valencian Community
1893 births
1967 deaths
20th-century Spanish musicians
20th-century Spanish male musicians